Heated is the fourth album by Canadian rock band Big Sugar, released on the A&M Records label.  It was released in the United States in 1999 on Capricorn Records with an alternate album cover. The US release also includes the hit track "Diggin' a Hole" from Hemi-Vision, which was not released in the US. The album was certified Platinum in Canada, selling over 100,000 copies.

The album features a cover of Bachman–Turner Overdrive's "Let it Ride".

Track listing 

Canadian release:

"Where I Stand" – 5:58
"Better Get Used to It" – 2:55
"The Scene" – 4:15
"Cop a Plea" – 4:55
"Girl Watcher" – 4:09
"Round & Round" – 4:43
"Kickin' Stones" – 5:14
"Hammer In My Hand" - 4:23
"100 Cigarettes" – 4:03
"Turn the Lights On" – 3:54
"Let It Ride" – 5:49
"Heart Refuse to Pound (For Alex)" – 5:27

US release:

"Where I Stand" – 5:58
"Better Get Used to It" – 2:55
"The Scene" – 4:15
"Girl Watcher" – 4:09
"Diggin' a Hole" – 4:39
"Cop a Plea" – 4:55
"Round & Round" – 4:43
"Kickin' Stones" – 5:14
"Let it Ride" – 5:49
"100 Cigarettes" – 4:03
"Turn the Lights On" – 3:54
"Heart Refuse to Pound (For Alex)" – 5:27

References

1998 albums
Big Sugar albums